Abhinay Banker (Hindi: अभिनय बेंकर, born on 14 September) is an actor, director, and writer who works in Gujarati cinema and theatre. After several theatre performances in his early career, he received recognition for his performance in Gujarati play Welcome Zindagi (2010), written and directed by Saumya Joshi, which has been performed over 650 times worldwide. He acted in Gujarati film Kevi Rite Jaish (2012).

Early life
Banker is born in Ahmedabad, Gujarat, India in a Gujarati Hindu family. During his studies, he worked as a freelance photo journalist for several news agencies from 2002–2005. He completed his Bachelor of Performing Arts in theatre from Gujarat University in April 2009 and received Gold medal. Since 2014, he is a contributing faculty cum mentor at School of liberal studies, Pandit Deendayal Petroleum University (PDPU).

Career
Abhinay Banker has acted in number of plays. His debuted in 2005 in a play, Natsamrat. In 2006, he became a theatre trainer and practitioner. He served as the head of the drama department at Darpana Academy of Performing Arts during 2012–2015. He is a founder-member of Actor's Theatre Ahmadabad, a group of theatre artist, and is a founder director of Aarambh Arts Academy.

In 2007, he acted as Anand in Mallika Sarabhai's Unsuni (Unheard Voices) which is an adaptation of former IAS officer Harsh Mander's novel of the same name. Despite facing the heat from Censor Board, it completed more than 150 performances.

He was appreciated by audience as a director-actor for his musical demonstration, based on Amrita Pritam's life, Main Tenu Phir Milangi (2011). Her love tale is about aside from others, as it talks about the purest unconditional love.

When Urdu writer Saadat Hasan Manto left Mumbai to visit Delhi, he said "Main khud ek chalta phirta Bambai hun" (I myself am a travelling Mumbai), to explain his connection to the city. Thus one of his plays has been named as Chalta Phirta Bambai (2012). In it, three joined stories unobtrusively depict the truth of life and all the while challenge the thought of innocence, love, ethics, morality, virtuousness and self-respect, but then ends in the nakedness and blatancy existent in our general public.

Banker has acted in the play, Akoopar (2013), based on the novel by Dhruv Bhatt. The play focuses on the existence of the Maldharis (animal breeders), who live within the Gir forest, the last home of the Asiatic lion. Directed by Aditi Desai, daughter of the theatre artiste late Jaswant Thakar, the play has been performed at the Bharat Rang Mahotsav at National School of Drama (NSD) Delhi. It has been additionally announced as the best play at Transmedia awards 2013.

The play Koi Pan Ek Phool Nu Naam Bolo To (Name any one flower) (2014) is a psychological murder mystery. It had been at first written with the aid of Gujarati writer Madhu Rye nearly five decades ago. In 1969, Kailash Pandya, who became the first head of the drama department of Darpana Academy of Performing Arts, directed the play. Forty-five years later, Abhinay Banker and his group performed it on the same stage. It had been also nominated for best drama production at 14th Transmedia Gujarati Screen & Stage Awards.

Director, actor and writer of the play Haji Ek Varta (2014), Abhinay Banker, portrayed it as a play that has the strings of immaculate humorousness, warmth and joy weaved suitably. It is a progression of six distinctive stories falling in a steady progression penned by various Gujarati writers. After its debut at the National Centre for the Performing Arts's (India) Gujarati Vasant Natyotsav 2014, the play was performed in Habitat Conclave, Ashapalli Festival at Ahmadabad in early 2016.

Banker is playing lead role in Aditi Desai's play Samudramanthan (2016). The story, delineating the battle for good over malice, is an anecdotal thought on the lives of Gujarati group of Kharwas (who live by the ocean) enlivened by an old book of the same name. It is genesis of a Nakhuda, the term utilized for a captain of the boat in Kharwas and demonstrates the agitating in the mid ocean that draws out all the nine rasa of human emotions. The play had been performed in19th Bharat Rang Mahotsav 2017 at National School of Drama.

Happy Journey (2016), a play written and directed by Abhinay Banker for H L Institute of Commerce, Ahmedabad University, demonstrated the life of today's youth as an understudy seeking after her interests and who experiences thick and diminishes of being in a relationship leading her into melancholy and how benevolently leaves it with the well-built backing of her father. It won first prize, received numerous awards in various categories as well as lifted a standout amongst the most pined for trophies in the field of theatre by INT (Indian National Theatre).

In 2022, Abhinay Banker was selected as the curator for Abhivyakti, an arts project including visual arts, music, dance and theatre. It invites artists across the country to participate in this annual project with mentoring by theatre personality Saumya Joshi.

Theater credits

Filmography

References

External links 

 

Living people
1984 births
21st-century Indian male actors
Male actors from Ahmedabad
Indian theatre people
Gujarati people
Gujarat University alumni